The Journal of Rural Health is a quarterly peer-reviewed medical journal covering rural health. It was established in 1981 as the American Journal of Rural Health, obtaining its current name in 1985. It is published by Wiley-Blackwell on behalf of the National Rural Health Association. The editor-in-chief is Tyrone Borders (University of Kentucky). According to the Journal Citation Reports, the journal has a 2021 impact factor of 5.667, ranking it 15/109 in Health Care Sciences & Services journals, 6/88 in Health Policy & Services journals, 49/210 in Public, Environmental & Occupational Health journals, and 27/183 in Public, Environmental & Occupational Health (Social Science) journals.

References

External links

Health policy journals
Wiley-Blackwell academic journals
Academic journals associated with learned and professional societies of the United States
Quarterly journals
Publications established in 1981
English-language journals